III Marine Expeditionary Force (III MEF) is a formation of the Marine Air-Ground Task Force of the United States Marine Corps.  It is forward-deployed and able to rapidly conduct operations across the spectrum from humanitarian assistance and disaster relief (HA/DR) to amphibious assault and high-intensity combat.

It maintains a forward presence in Japan and Asia to support the Treaty of Mutual Cooperation and Security between the United States and Japan (1960) and other alliance relationships of the United States. III MEF also conducts combined operations and training throughout the region in support of the National Security Strategy for Theater Security Cooperation.

The Marines and sailors of III MEF engage in more than 65 combined, bilateral and multilateral training exercises annually throughout the Asia-Pacific region, in countries including treaty allies Japan, Thailand, South Korea, the Philippines, and Australia. These exercises build partner capacity, develop and maintain strong regional alliances and military-to-military contacts. These exercises prepare III MEF to conduct operations ranging from major combat operations to humanitarian assistance and disaster relief.

III MEF has played a significant role in humanitarian assistance and disaster relief missions throughout the region. The MEF assisted the relief efforts led by the Government of Japan during Operation Tomodachi after the 2011 Tōhoku earthquake and tsunami. III MEF also conducted HA/DR missions in Thailand in October 2011, the Philippines in October 2010, and Indonesia in October 2009. Most recently in response to the resulting humanitarian crisis from Typhoon Haiyan which struck the Philippines in 2013, III MEF activated as Joint Task Force 505 to conduct humanitarian assistance and disaster relief operations in support of the Philippine government. More than 2,495 tons of relief supplies were delivered, and over 21,000 people were evacuated.

Mission
Commanded by a lieutenant general with its headquarters at Camp Courtney, III MEF's mission is to provide forward based and deployed forces to the commander, U.S. Indo-Pacific Command, to conduct Phase 0 engagement and theater security cooperation events, support contingencies and emergent requirements, and prepare to rapidly execute existing operations plans in support of the theater and national military strategies.

III MEF is organized as a Marine Air Ground Task Force (MAGTF) to provide a rapidly deployable, flexible self-contained fighting force. The Marines combine air, ground, and logistics forces to operate as a coherent, self-sufficient force. Each mission dictates the MAGTF's scale and structure, giving the Marine Corps the flexibility to respond to any crisis and making a "force in readiness." A MEF is the largest of all MAGTFs.

History
III Marine Expeditionary Force was activated as I Amphibious Corps 1 October 1942 in Camp Elliott, San Diego, California. Later that month, they were deployed to Noumea, New Caledonia. The unit was redesignated as III Amphibious Corps 15 April 1944. III Amphibious Corps was deactivated on 10 June 1946.

III Marine Expeditionary Force was activated 6 May 1965 at Da Nang, Republic of Vietnam. III MEF was re-designated to III Marine Amphibious Force (III MAF) 7 May 1965.

III Marine Amphibious Force deployed to Camp Courtney, Okinawa April 1971. III MAF was redesignated to III Marine Expeditionary Force 5 February 1988.

World War II
During World War II, III MEF was known as I Marine Amphibious Corps.  It was renamed III Amphibious Corps on 15 April 1944, and took part in fighting against the Japanese Empire in the Pacific theater during World War II. It fought in some of the bloodiest battles, including the Solomon Islands campaign, the Mariana and Palau Islands campaign and the Volcano and Ryukyu Islands campaign (namely the Battle of Okinawa). III Amphibious Corps redeployed to Tientsin, China, in September 1945, where it participated in the occupation of Northern China until June 1946. III Amphibious Corps was deactivated on 10 June 1946.

Vietnam War
III MEF was reactivated 6 May 1965 in Da Nang, Republic of Vietnam under Major General William R. Collins. 7 May 1965, III MEF was re-designated as III Marine Amphibious Force (III MAF) and consisted of the 1st Marine Division, 3rd Marine Division and the 1st Marine Aircraft Wing. The III MAF's area of operations was in the northern I Corps Tactical Zone. III MAF participated in the Vietnam War from May 1965 – April 1971 operating from Quang Tri, Thua Thien, Quang Nam, Quang Tin, and Quang Ngai. III MAF deployed to Camp Courtney, Okinawa in April 1971.

1990s–2010s
Since III MAF was redesignated to III Marine Expeditionary Force (III MEF) 5 February 1988, they have participated in many different operations. These operations include the Persian Gulf War's Operation Desert Shield, Operation Desert Storm, as well as Operation Provide Comfort in Southwest Asia and Iraq from Sept. 1990 – April 1991 and May–June 1991. III MEF elements have also played a vital role in Operation Sea Angel in Bangladesh from May–June 1991; Operation Fiery Vigil in the Philippines June 1991; Operation Restore Hope and Operation Continue Hope in Somalia from December 1992 to March 1994. III MEF elements have also had a significant impact on the Iraq War's Operation Iraqi Freedom as well as the Global War on Terrorism's Enduring Freedom.

One of the biggest roles III MEF plays in the Asia-Pacific region is humanitarian assistance and disaster relief (HA/DR). III MEF elements participated in Operation Unified Assistance in response to the tsunami disaster in Southeast Asia from December 2004 to February 2005. III MEF has also assisted with the 2005 Kashmir earthquake response from October 2005 to March 2006; Philippine mudslide response in March and April 2006; 2006 Yogyakarta earthquake response in May and June 2006; Legazpi typhoon recovery in March 2007; 2007 Solomon Islands earthquake and tsunami response in April 2007; Operation Sea Angel II in Bangladesh from November to December 2007; Operation Caring Response in Burma from May and June 2008; Taiwan typhoon relief in August 2009; Philippine typhoon and Indonesian earthquake relief in October 2009; Philippine typhoon relief in October 2010; Operation Tomodachi in May 2011; Thailand flood relief from October through November 2011; and Philippine typhoon relief in December 2012 and again in November 2013.

Structure

III Marine Expeditionary Force, together with I Marine Expeditionary Force, makes up Marine Forces, Pacific.

Units

 Ground combat element: 3rd Marine Division
 Aviation combat element: 1st Marine Aircraft Wing
 Logistics combat element: 3rd Marine Logistics Group
 Command element: III Marine Expeditionary Force Information Group (MIG)
 III MEF Support Battalion
 3rd Intelligence Battalion
 3rd Radio Battalion
 7th Communication Battalion
 5th Air Naval Gunfire Liaison Company (ANGLICO)
 3rd Marine Expeditionary Brigade
 31st Marine Expeditionary Unit

III MEF Band
As the Eastern Hemisphere’s sole musical representative of the United States Marine Corps, the III MEF Band enjoys a busy schedule filled with performances across Okinawa and throughout the Far East each year.  The band capitalizes on this unique position by making it a priority to present community outreach performances and participating in international military band festivals in South Korea, Tokyo, and Kumamoto, Japan.  Consisting of musicians trained in a variety of musical styles, the III MEF Band is able to provide a number of small ensembles for civilian events, including brass and woodwind quintets, jazz combo, rock band, and brass band.  The band was awarded the title of 2018 Marine Corps Band of the Year in February 2018.

The following comprises the leadership of the band:

Officer in Charge/Band Director – CWO3 DeMarius Jackson
Bandmaster – Master Gunnery Sergeant J. Michael Stanley
Instrument Repair Technician – Gunnery Sergeant Neil Loaiza
Enlisted Conductor – Staff Sergeant Wayne Geary
Drum Major – Gunnery Sergeant Robert Brooks
Small Ensemble Leader – Gunnery Sergeant Michael Newell

Uniquely, the band has its own mascot, which helps represent the band when on parade. The history of the use of a mascot dates back to 1974, when the Commanding General of the 1st Marine Aircraft Wing presented a Golden Retriever to the 1st MAW Band. Since then, four mascots have served the III MEF Band. Since November of 2012, Sgt Chopper V has continued this unique tradition.

Gallery

Locations and units

Japan

Okinawa
 Marine Corps Base Camp Smedley D. Butler
 Marine Corps Air Station Futenma
 III Marine Expeditionary Force Command Element (III MEF CE)
 III Marine Expeditionary Force Headquarters Group (III MHG)
III Marine Expeditionary Force Headquarters and Service Company (III MEF HQSVC)
 3rd Marine Expeditionary Brigade (3rd MEB)
 3rd Marine Division (3rd MarDiv)
 1st Marine Aircraft Wing (1st MAW)
 3rd Marine Logistics Group (3rd MLG)
 31st Marine Expeditionary Unit (31st MEU)

Honshu
 Camp Fuji
 Marine Corps Air Station Iwakuni
 Marine Aircraft Group 12
 Combat Logistics Company 36

United States

Hawaii
 Marine Corps Air Station Kaneohe Bay
 3rd Marine Regiment
 Marine Aircraft Group 24
 Combat Logistics Battalion 3
 Combat Logistics Company 33
 Combat Logistics Company 35

South Korea
 Camp Mujuk

List of commanders

Awards and decorations

Notable former members

William R. Collins, commanding general in the Vietnam War 1965
Robert E. Cushman Jr., commanding general in the Vietnam War 1967–1969
Leo J. Dulacki, served as chief of staff in the Vietnam War 1969–1970
Roy Geiger, commanding general in World War II
Carl W. Hoffman, commanding general in the Vietnam War 1974–1975
William G. Joslyn served as chief of staff in the Vietnam War 1970–1971
Keith B. McCutcheon, commanding general in the Vietnam War 1970–1971
Herman Nickerson Jr., commanding general in the Vietnam War 1960–1970
Earl S. Piper, served as logistics officer in North China 1945–1946
Jonas M. Platt, served as chief of staff in the Vietnam War 1965–1966
Herman Poggemeyer Jr., commanding general in the Vietnam War 1973–1974
Donn J. Robertson, commanding general in the Vietnam War 1970–1972
Michael P. Ryan, commanding general in the Vietnam War 1973
Lawrence F. Snowden, served as operations officer in the Vietnam War 1966–1967
Rathvon M. Tompkins, served as deputy commander in the Vietnam War 1968
William J. Van Ryzin, served as deputy commander in the Vietnam War 1968
Lewis William Walt, commanding general in the Vietnam War 1965–1967
Herbert L. Wilkerson, served as operations officer in the Vietnam War 1970
Carl A. Youngdale, served as deputy commander in the Vietnam War 1968–1969

Gallery

See also 

 List of corps of the United States

Notes
Citations

References used

External links

 

03
1942 establishments in the United States
1946 in the United States
1965 establishments in the United States
Corps of the United States Marine Corps
Military units and formations disestablished in 1946
Military units and formations established in 1942
Military units and formations established in 1965
Military units and formations of the United States Marine Corps in World War II